Bethel is a town in York County, in the U.S. state of South Carolina.

History
The community took its name in the 18th century from the local Bethel Presbyterian church.

References

Geography of York County, South Carolina
Ghost towns in South Carolina